Sergius of Naples may refer to

Sergius I of Naples (died 864)
Sergius II of Naples, Duke of Naples from 870 to 877
Sergius III of Naples
Sergius IV of Naples (died after 1036)
Sergius V of Naples, son and successor of John V as Duke of Naples from 1042 to 1082
Sergius VI of Naples (died 1097 or 1107)
Sergius VII of Naples (died 1137)